Yoya Martínez, real name Ofelia Martner Semblett (August 27, 1912 Santiago, Chile - February 1, 2009) was a Chilean actress. She is best known for her role as Hilda Viuda de Maturana on the popular TVN television series, Los Venegas from 1989 until 2008.

Filmography

Television series 
 Incomunicados (1968)
 El loco estero (1968)
 La señora (1969)
 J.J. Juez (1975)
 La madrastra (1981)
 La señora (1982)
 Bienvenido hermano Andes (1982)
 La noche del cobarde (1983)
 La trampa (1985)
 La última cruz (1987)
 La intrusa (1989)
 Marrón Glacé, el regreso (1996)
 Santiago city (1997)
 Fuera de control (1999)
 La vida es una lotería (2002) (2 episodios)
 Geografía del deseo (2004)
 Los Venegas (1989-2008)

Films 
 Yo vendo unos ojos negros (1948)
 The Last Gallop (1951)
 El burócrata (1964)
 Treinta años (2006)

References

External links 
 

1912 births
2009 deaths
Chilean people of English descent
Chilean film actresses
Chilean television actresses
Chilean telenovela actresses
People from Santiago